Maurice Graffen (22 October 1924 – 4 December 2016) was a French sprint kayaker who competed from the late 1940s to the late 1950s. He won a bronze medal in the K-4 1000 m event at the 1954 ICF Canoe Sprint World Championships in Mâcon. Graffen also competed in three Summer Olympics, earning his best finish of fifth in the K-2 1000 m event at Melbourne in 1956.

References

Maurice Graffen's profile at Sports Reference.com
Maurice Graffen's obituary

1924 births
2016 deaths
Canoeists at the 1948 Summer Olympics
Canoeists at the 1952 Summer Olympics
Canoeists at the 1956 Summer Olympics
French male canoeists
Olympic canoeists of France
ICF Canoe Sprint World Championships medalists in kayak